In sports, particularly team sports, the player name, often referred to as the uniform name, squad name, jersey name, shirt name is the name worn on a player's uniform.

Originally, the number worn on a player's uniform was used to identify and distinguish each players (and sometimes others, such as coaches and officials) from others wearing the same or similar uniforms.

Generally, a surname is used, but a nickname is also common. The name is typically displayed on the rear of the jersey, often accompanied by the number. Name printing is also used from a sports marketing point, such as to promote the player to fans and jersey sales.

Association football

In association football, the first record of numbered jerseys date back to 1911, with Australian teams Sydney Leichardt and HMS Powerful being the first to use squad numbers on their backs. The 1950 FIFA World Cup was the first FIFA competition to see squad numbers for all players, but persistent numbers would not be issued until the 1954 World Cup, where each man in a country's 22-man squad wore a specific number from 1 to 22 for the duration of the tournament.

In 1994 FIFA World Cup, FIFA made changes to the jersey, adding squad numbers to the front in addition to the back and adding player names to the back of the jerseys for the first time. These modifications were implemented to make it easier for television and radio broadcasters to identify players. In the North American Soccer League of the 1970s, UEFA Euro 1992, 1992 Olympic Football and 1993–94 FA Premier League, names on jerseys were also used, but after 1994 FIFA World Cup, they became more commonly used in various football competitions worldwide.

Baseball
In Major League Baseball, uniform numbers were not introduced until 1929 by the New York Yankees and Cleveland Indians; names on uniforms were introduced in 1960 by the Bill Veeck of Chicago White Sox.

Despite introducing numbers to professional baseball, however, the current Yankees uniform do not have player names printing because of team tradition and philosophy, arguing that baseball is a team sport and not having player names emphasizes the value the importance of teamwork and unity over individual stardom.

Cricket
In 2019, jersey names were authorized for the first time in Test cricket. They were first seen used in the 2019 Ashes series.

Gridiron football
In gridiron football, which includes American football and Canadian football, names on jerseys are used frequently and are mandatory in current professional play. In college football and high school football, where team rosters are often in excess of 100 players, there may be multiple players with the same uniform number; player names help with disambiguation between the players. Some schools may choose not to print player names on uniforms either for financial or philosophical reasons; Penn State, Notre Dame, and USC are examples of the latter.

The original 2001 incarnation of the XFL infamously allowed players to replace their surnames with a nickname of their choosing; the most well-known of these was Rod Smart who chose to put the phrase "He Hate Me" on his uniform. In 2018, players at Temple were allowed to replace their surnames with their Twitter account handles for their annual spring game as a promotional stunt.

Ice hockey

At the start of the 1977–78 season, the National Hockey League (NHL) placed into effect a rule that also required players' sweaters to display the names of the players wearing them in addition to their number, but Toronto Maple Leafs owner Harold Ballard initially refused to follow the new rule, fearing that he would not be able to sell programs at his team's games. 

The NHL responded by threatening to levy a fine on the team in February 1978, so Ballard complied by making the letters the same color as the background they were on, which for the team's road jerseys was blue. The NHL threatened further sanctions, and despite playing more than one game with their "unreadable" sweaters, Ballard's Maple Leafs finally complied in earnest by making the blue jerseys' letters white.

References

 
Terminology used in multiple sports
Sports uniforms